Eidophasia messingiella is a moth of the family Plutellidae. It is found in most of Europe (except Ireland, the Iberian Peninsula, Slovenia and Ukraine).

The wingspan is 14–16 mm. Adults are on wing from June to July in one generation per year.

The larvae feed on Cardaria draba, Cardamine amara and Lunaria rediviva. Young larvae bore through a shoot of their host plants and make holes in the leaves. Older larvae feed on the underside of leaves. Pupation takes place in open network cocoons on the food plants or in detritus on the ground.

References

Moths described in 1840
Plutellidae
Moths of Europe
Insects of Turkey
Taxa named by Josef Emanuel Fischer von Röslerstamm